Kenneth Charles Armstrong (31 January 1959 – 10 July 2022) was an English professional footballer who played as a centre half.

Playing career  
Of Scottish parentage, Armstrong was born in Bridgnorth, Shropshire, while his father was working in the area. Spotted while playing for Beith Juniors, he made 88 appearances and scored three goals in the Scottish Football League playing for Kilmarnock, and made 94 appearances, scoring twice, in the English Football League playing for Southampton, Notts County and Birmingham City. He was part of the Southampton squad that finished second to Liverpool in the 1983–84 season. He signed for Walsall in February 1986 for a fee of £10,000, broke his ankle in his first training session, and nine months later, still only 27 years of age, retired from football because of the injury without ever playing for the club.

Later life 
After football, Armstrong became a social worker and held managerial position in the NHS. He was a business manager with Monklands and Bellshill Hospital NHS Trust from 1993 before moving in 1996 to The Freeman Group of Hospitals NHS Trust which became the Newcastle upon Tyne Hospitals NHS Trust in 1998 where he worked as a general manager, until 1999 when he moved to NHS Tayside as director of operations.

Armstrong died in the early hours of 10 July 2022, at the age of 63.

Honours
Southampton
Football League First Division runners-up: 1983–84

Notes

References

External links
Birmingham City F.C. match programme article reproduced on Beith Juniors F.C. website

1959 births
2022 deaths
People from Bridgnorth
English footballers
Association football central defenders
Beith Juniors F.C. players
Kilmarnock F.C. players
Southampton F.C. players
Notts County F.C. players
Birmingham City F.C. players
Walsall F.C. players
Scottish Junior Football Association players
Scottish Football League players
English Football League players
English people of Scottish descent